Adolf Láng (born Adolf Lang; 15 June 1848 – 2 May 1913), was a Hungarian-German architect, one of the main representatives of the historicist style during the late 1900s.

Career
Lang studied in Vienna and from 1870 became the director of works for the company which built the boulevards and ring roads in Budapest. He also designed a number of private and public buildings for the capital, and later taught in Bucharest. Upon his return to Hungary, he entered into a partnership with Antal Steinhardt and spent his final years in Vienna.

Works
Old Music Academy, Budapest
Old Exhibition Hall, Budapest
National Theatre of Pécs, 1893–95
Former Hungarian (Magyar) Theatre, 1897
State Theatre Košice, 1899
Pécs City Hall, 1907

Lang,Adolf
Historicist architects
1913 deaths
1848 births
Hungarian people of German descent
Romanian people of German descent